The following events occurred in February 1924:

February 1, 1924 (Friday)
The British government formally recognized the Soviet Union. 
Honduran President Rafael López Gutiérrez set up a dictatorship.
The plaintiff's side rested its case in the Joe Jackson – Chicago White Sox trial, and court adjourned until the following Monday.

February 2, 1924 (Saturday)
Alexei Rykov became Chairman of the Council of People's Commissars of the Soviet Union, equivalent to Prime Minister of the Soviet Union, filling the vacancy left by the death of Lenin. 
Felix Dzerzhinsky became Chairman of the Supreme Soviet of the National Economy.
Woodrow Wilson fell into a coma shortly before 10:30 p.m.
Toyama Toy Manufacturing, as predecessor of Takara Tomy was founded in Japan.
Born: Elfi von Dassanowsky, Austrian singer, pianist and film producer; in Vienna (d. 2007)

February 3, 1924 (Sunday)
The Soviet Union welcomed Britain's diplomatic recognition of the USSR as an "historic step" and pledged to "make every effort to settle all misunderstandings and develop and consolidate economic relations."
Germany and Turkey signed a Treaty of Friendship.
Died: Woodrow Wilson, 67, 28th President of the United States, in his Washington, D.C., home at 11:15 in the morning.

February 4, 1924 (Monday)
Austria formally recognized the Soviet Union.
Born: Dorothy Harrell, baseball player, in Los Angeles (d. 2011)

February 5, 1924 (Tuesday)
The Winter Olympics closed in Chamonix, France. Norway and Finland tied for the most gold medals with four each, but Norway won 17 total medals to Finland's 11. 
Mexican rebels retreated from their former stronghold of Veracruz when federal troops won a crucial victory at Córdoba.
The government of British India released Mahatma Gandhi from prison two years into his six-year sentence, citing "reasons of health".
A controversy broke out over the German embassy in Washington, D.C. not offering any condolences over the death of Wilson nor flying its flag at half mast. The embassy issued a statement saying it would fly its flag at half-mast the next day in observance of the national mourning on the day of Wilson's funeral.

February 6, 1924 (Wednesday)
Woodrow Wilson was buried in the Washington National Cathedral.
Demonstrators raised disturbances outside the German embassy in Washington. About 200 taxi drivers walked onto its lawn, planted an American flag and saluted it amid cheers and pistol shots.

February 7, 1924 (Thursday)
Mexican rebel leader Adolfo de la Huerta and his staff withdrew by boat to Mérida, Yucatán after federal troops recaptured the key city of Veracruz.
Italy formally recognized the Soviet Union.

February 8, 1924 (Friday)
U.S. President Calvin Coolidge signed a resolution ordering the Doheny and Sinclair petroleum leases to be nullified due to the Teapot Dome scandal.
The first execution by lethal gas in American history was carried out in Carson City, Nevada. Chinese national Gee Jon, convicted over a gangland slaying, was the executed man.
The Joe Jackson-White Sox trial continued with the reading of a deposition by Eddie Cicotte and the testimony of Red Faber. Cicotte declined to answer almost all the questions asked of him on the grounds of potential self-incrimination.
Born: Ada Lois Sipuel Fisher, civil rights figure, in Chickasha, Oklahoma (d. 1995)

February 9, 1924 (Saturday)
The Nakhchivan Autonomous Soviet Socialist Republic was established.

February 10, 1924 (Sunday)
Mexican federal troops won a decisive battle over the rebels at Ocotlán.
Born: Bud Poile, hockey player, in Fort William, Ontario, Canada (d. 2005)

February 11, 1924 (Monday)
The United States Senate passed a resolution by a vote of 47 to 34 calling on President Coolidge to remove Edwin Denby as Secretary of the Navy over his role in the Teapot Dome scandal. Coolidge issued a formal statement that evening saying he would ignore the resolution. "As soon as special counsel can advise me as to the legality of these leases and assemble for me the pertinent facts in the various transactions, I shall take such action as seems essential for the full protection of the public interests", the statement read.
Died: Jean-François Raffaëlli, 74, French painter, sculptor and printmaker

February 12, 1924 (Tuesday)
Howard Carter and his archaeological team had the lid of Pharaoh Tutankhamun's stone sarcophagus raised, revealing his solid gold mummy case.
The George Gershwin musical composition Rhapsody in Blue premiered at the Aeolian Hall in New York City.
The play Beggar on Horseback by George S. Kaufman and Marc Connelly opened on Broadway.
Oscar "Happy" Felsch took the witness stand in the Joe Jackson-White Sox trial as a rebuttal witness for the plaintiff. Felsch was brought in to challenge the testimony of Harry Grabiner, who'd claimed he could not have signed Jackson to the 1920 contract in question because it was signed with a fountain pen, and he did not own one. The defense lawyers produced a number of letters passed between Felsch and owner Charles Comiskey as well as his 1920 contract, but Felsch denied that any of the signatures were his.
Died: Ernest Joy, 46, American actor

February 13, 1924 (Wednesday)
German nationalists launched an attack on the headquarters of Rhineland separatists in Pirmasens, smashing their way into the building and setting it ablaze while snipers set up outside to shoot at the separatists. At least 36 died in the fighting and the blaze, with most of the casualties on the separatist side. An elderly woman bystander was also killed by a stray bullet.
An assembly for British fascists was staged at the Hotel Cecil in London to meet and discuss common goals. It was the first fascist event ever held in public in the United Kingdom. About 500 black-shirted Britons and Italian expatriates attended.
Happy Felsch was arrested for perjury over his testimony of the previous day. Felsch posted his own $2,000 bail and was released.
Howard Carter abruptly suspended work on Tutankhamun's tomb and had it resealed, "owing to the impossible restrictions and discourtesies on the part of the public works department and its antiquity section." The dispute was reportedly about media access rights.

February 14, 1924 (Thursday)
Mexican federal troops inflicted another defeat on rebels near Paloverde southwest of Pénjamo.
The Computing-Tabulating-Recording Company (CTR) renamed itself the International Business Machines Corporation, or IBM.
Part 1 of the Fritz Lang fantasy film Die Nibelungen premiered at the Ufa-Palast am Zoo in Berlin.
Born: Juan Ponce Enrile, politician, in Gonzaga, Cagayan, Philippines

February 15, 1924 (Friday)
U.S. Senator Frank L. Greene of Vermont was seriously wounded when he was shot in the head by a stray bullet during a shootout between Prohibition enforcement agents and bootleggers. Senator Greene had been walking along Washington's Pennsylvania Avenue with his wife, and was left partially paralyzed.  
The jury in the Joe Jackson-White Sox case awarded Jackson over $16,000 in unpaid salary. However, Judge Gregory declared that the plaintiff's case was based on perjury and threw the jury's ruling out. Jackson was triumphant at the verdict despite it being overruled.

February 16, 1924 (Saturday)
Nearly 200,000 British dock workers went on strike.
German artist George Grosz was fined 500 gold marks (6,000 marks) when a collection of his drawings depicting the decadence of Berlin society was ruled obscene by the court.
Born: Ray Gunkel, professional wrestler, in Chicago (d. 1972)
Died: John William Kendrick, 70, American railroad executive; Wilhelm Schmidt, 65, German engineer and inventor

February 17, 1924 (Sunday)
A referendum on employment protection was held in Switzerland. Voters rejected a proposed amendment to the federal employment protection law.
A four-pound loaf of bread went up a halfpenny to eightpence-halfpenny as a result of the dock strike.
The Western film The Night Hawk starring Harry Carey was released.
Herma Szabo of Austria won the women's competition of the World Figure Skating Championships held in Oslo, Norway.
Born: Margaret Truman, singer and only child of Harry and Bess Truman, in Independence, Missouri (d. 2008)
Died: Henry Bacon, 57, American architect

February 18, 1924 (Monday)
British Prime Minister Ramsay MacDonald warned against profiteers extracting "unjust prices" during the dock worker's strike. "The cabinet hopes this notice will have the effect of stopping these increases, but in the meantime it has asked that law officers consider the powers of the government in this matter and draft such emergency measures as may be necessary to prevent exploitation of the consumers owing to the present strike", he said.

February 19, 1924 (Tuesday)
An initial outline of the Dawes committee's financial plan was presented to French Prime Minister Raymond Poincaré in Paris.
Born: Lee Marvin, actor, in New York City (d. 1987)

February 20, 1924 (Wednesday)
French military leaders objected to a clause in the Dawes proposal that would return the railroads in the occupied Ruhr region to German control.
Born: Gerson Goldhaber, particle physicist, in Chemnitz, Germany (d. 2010); Gloria Vanderbilt, artist, actress, fashion designer and socialite, in New York City (d. 2019)

February 21, 1924 (Thursday)
British dock workers rejected the terms offered to them for a settlement of the strike. Their employers had offered them an immediate 1 shilling-per-day raise with another shilling to be added June 1. 
The D. W. Griffith-directed film America premiered at the 44th Street Theatre in New York City.
Born: Robert Mugabe, President of Zimbabwe, in Kutama (d. 2019)

February 22, 1924 (Friday)
Calvin Coolidge became the first President to make a radio broadcast from the White House when he gave a national address on the occasion of George Washington's birthday.

February 23, 1924 (Saturday)

Albanian Prime Minister Ahmet Zogu was shot just before a parliamentary session. He survived the assassination attempt but was seriously wounded.
A general strike began in Cuba.
The Royal Navy intervened in the dock worker's strike to move 4,500 bags of American mail.
Britain agreed to collect a five percent duty on German imports in war reparations rather than 26 percent.
Born: Allan McLeod Cormack, physicist and recipient of the Nobel Prize in Physiology or Medicine, in Johannesburg, South Africa (d. 1998)

February 24, 1924 (Sunday)
Mexican federal troops defeated rebels in a battle fought in an oil region in the state of Tamaulipas.
The Beverly Hills Speedway hosted its final race, attended by 85,000. The track was torn down afterward because the rapidly increasing real estate values had rendered the track an uneconomical use of property. Harlan Fengler broke the world record for a 250-mile race, averaging 116.6 miles per hour.
British dock workers voted to accept the offer of their employers to receive a rise of 1 shilling-per-day plus an additional shilling on June 1.

February 25, 1924 (Monday)
The Western film Ride for Your Life was released.
The Cuban strike was settled.

February 26, 1924 (Tuesday)
The Beer Hall Putsch trial for treason of Adolf Hitler, Erich Ludendorff and other Nazis began in Munich. Security was heavy and onlookers were thoroughly searched for weapons before being allowed in.
Transport and General Workers Union dock workers ended their strike.
Born: Freda Betti, singer, in Nice, France (d. 1979); Noboru Takeshita, Prime Minister of Japan, in Unnan, Shimane, Japan (d. 2000)

February 27, 1924 (Wednesday)
The government of Georges Theunis fell in Belgium over a vote on a Franco-Belgian import-export bill. The news caused the ailing French franc to immediately drop to a new low, 24.50 to the U.S. dollar.
Gillis Grafström of Sweden won the men's competition in the World Figure Skating Championships in Manchester, England.

February 28, 1924 (Thursday)
The Kingdom of Yugoslavia increased its troop presence on its border with Bulgaria across from Pernik, in response to raids from Macedonian irregulars from the area.

February 29, 1924 (Friday)
Erich Ludendorff took the stand in his defense in the trial at Munich. He gave a long justification of the reasons for attempting the putsch, explaining, "We want a Germany free of Marxism, semitism, and papal influences."
Born: Al Rosen, baseball player, in Spartanburg, South Carolina (d. 2015)

References

1924
1924-02
1924-02